James Schuldt (born May 11, 1995) is an American professional ice hockey defenseman who is currently playing for the Coachella Valley Firebirds in the American Hockey League (AHL). He has previously played with the Vegas Golden Knights of the National Hockey League (NHL).

Early life
Schuldt was born on May 11, 1995, to parents Steve and Sheri Schuldt in Minnetonka, Minnesota. Both of his parents were involved in sports growing up; his father played offensive line for the St. Cloud State football team while his mother was recruited to St. Cloud State to play softball.

Playing career
Schuldt played junior hockey for three seasons with the Omaha Lancers of the United States Hockey League (OHL) before going on to play collegiate hockey at St. Cloud State University. He captained the Huskies during his last three seasons there. Schuldt was a Hobey Baker Award finalist and All-NCHC First Team two times at St. Cloud State and during his senior season, he was also named NCHC Player of the Year and NCHC Defensive Defenseman of the Year. On March 12, Schuldt was named to the AHCA First-Team All-American.

On April 3, 2019, Schuldt signed a one-year entry-level contract with the Vegas Golden Knights. He made his debut on April 6, 2019, against the Los Angeles Kings.

As a free agent from the Golden Knights, Schuldt agreed to a one-year, two-way contract with the Buffalo Sabres on July 28, 2021. In the following 2021–22 season, Schuldt played exclusively with the Sabres AHL affiliate, the Rochester Americans, appearing in a professional high 61 regular season games from the blueline in contributing with 5 goals and 17 points.

Schuldt continued his career in the AHL signing a one-year AHL contract with the Coachella Valley Firebirds, affiliate to the Seattle Kraken, for their inaugural 2022–23 season, on September 22, 2022.

Career statistics

Awards and honors

References

External links
 

1995 births
Living people
AHCA Division I men's ice hockey All-Americans
American men's ice hockey defensemen
Chicago Wolves players
Coachella Valley Firebirds players
Henderson Silver Knights players
Ice hockey players from Minnesota
Omaha Lancers players
Rochester Americans players
St. Cloud State Huskies men's ice hockey players
Undrafted National Hockey League players
Vegas Golden Knights players